Gablingen is a municipality in the district of Augsburg in Bavaria in Germany. It lies on the river Schmutter.

References

Augsburg (district)